Testimony is a 1988 British independent musical drama film directed by Tony Palmer and starring Ben Kingsley, Sherry Baines and Robert Stephens. The film is based on the memoirs of Dmitri Shostakovich (1906–1975) as dictated in the book Testimony (edited by Solomon Volkov) and filmed in Panavision.

Cast
Ben Kingsley as Dmitri Shostakovich
Sherry Baines as Nina Shostakovich
Magdalen Asquith as Galya Shostakovich
Mark Asquith as Maxim Shostakovich
Terence Rigby as Joseph Stalin
Ronald Pickup as Mikhail Tukhachevsky
John Shrapnel as Andrei Zhdanov
Robert Reynolds as Brutus
Vernon Dobtcheff as Gargolovsky
Colin Hurst as Stalin’s Secretary
Joyce Grundy as Keke Geladze
Mark Thrippleton as Young Joseph Stalin
Liza Goddard as The English Humanist
Peter Woodthorpe as Alexander Glazunov
Robert Stephens as Vsevolod Meyerhold
William Squire as Aram Khachaturian
Murray Melvin as The Film Editor
Robert Urquhart as The Journalist
Christopher Bramwell as Vanya
Brook Williams as H. G. Wells
Marita Phillips as Madam Lupinskaya

Music
London Philharmonic Orchestra
Leader: David Nolan
Conductor: Rudolf Barshai
The Golden Age Singers
Chorus Master: Simon Preston
 Chilingirian Quartet
 Soloists
Margaret Fingerhut
Yuzuko Horigome
Felicity Palmer
Howard Shelley
John Shirley-Quirk

Awards
Winner of the Gold Medal for Best Drama - New York International Film Festival
Winner of the Fellini Prize - UNESCO
Winner of the Critics Prize - São Paulo International Film Festival

See also
Stalinism
Testimony (Volkov book)
Solomon Volkov

Further reading
 Volkov, Solomon: Shostakovich and Stalin: The Extraordinary Relationship Between the Great Composer and the Brutal Dictator; Knopf 2004. 
 Fay, Laurel: Shostakovich versus Volkov: Whose Testimony? – The Russian Review, vol. 39 no. 4 October 1980 pp. 484–493.

External links
 
 

1988 drama films
1988 films
1988 independent films
1980s British films
1980s English-language films
1980s musical drama films
British biographical films
British independent films
British musical drama films
Cultural depictions of H. G. Wells
Cultural depictions of Joseph Stalin
Films about classical music and musicians
Films about composers
Films based on non-fiction books
Films directed by Tony Palmer
Films shot in Greater Manchester
Dmitri Shostakovich